Lysá hora is the highest mountain of the Moravian-Silesian Beskids range in the Czech Republic and also of the historical region of Cieszyn Silesia. It is the 26th highest mountain in the country.

Etymology
The name means 'bald mountain'; the name came from the fact that Lysá hora had no trees. The place was first mentioned in a written document from 1261 as Lissa huera.

Climate

Tourism
Today, the mountain is also a small ski resort and a popular place for hiking in summer, attracting casual hikers, and fans of Nordic walking, running, cross-country skiing, and alpine skiing. The area has also hosted various sports competitions.

It is the site of the Ivančena stone mound erected as a memorial for the Scouts who were executed in April 1945 in Cieszyn, modern-day Poland, for their part in anti-Nazi resistance.

Gallery

References

External links

Mountains and hills of the Czech Republic
Moravian-Silesian Beskids
Frýdek-Místek District
Ski areas and resorts in the Czech Republic